Daniel Fernandez or Fernández may refer to:

Sports and games

Association football (soccer)
 Daniel Fernández (football manager, born 1963), Argentine football coach and player
 Daniel Fernández (football manager, born 1973), Uruguayan football manager
 Daniel Fernández (footballer, born 1978), Argentine footballer
 Dani Fernández (footballer, born 1983), Spanish footballer
 Dani Fernández (footballer, born 1987), Spanish footballer
 Dani Fernández (footballer, born 1997), Spanish footballer

Other sports
 Daniel Fernández (judoka) (born 1985), Belgian judoka
 Daniel Fernandez (chess player) (born 1995), English chess grandmaster

Others
 Daniel Fernández Crespo (1901–1964), Uruguayan politician
 Daniel D. Fernández (1944–1966), American soldier and Medal of Honor recipient
 Daniel Fernández Torres (born 1964), Puerto Rican bishop
 Daniel Fernandez (Uruguayan Air Force Flight 571) (fl. 1972), survivor of the crash which inspired the film Alive
 Daniel Fernández del Castaño (born 1979), Argentine model and actor
 Dani Fernández (singer) (born 1991), Spanish singer, member of Spanish boy band Auryn

See also 
 Danilo Fernandez (born 1958), Filipino politician
 Danny Fernandes (born 1985), Canadian singer of Portuguese descent
 Daniel Fernandes (disambiguation)